Infinite Justice may refer to:

Infinite Justice (film), a 2007 English film directed by Jamil Dehlavi
Operation Enduring Freedom, the "military response to the September 11, 2001 attacks on the United States", initially planned to be named as Operation Infinite Justice
The Algebra of Infinite Justice, a 2001 book of essays by Arundhati Roy
ZGMF-X19A Infinite Justice Gundam, a fictional weapon from the Cosmic Era of the anime Gundam metaseries